Lysandra albicans, the Spanish chalk-hill blue, is a butterfly of the family Lycaenidae. It is found in Spain and Western North Africa.

The length of the forewings is 18–21 mm. The species of Lysandra are very similar and difficult to identify and L. albicans was once a subspecies of Lysandra coridon. It is the palest of the complex. 
The upperside of the male is almost white, adorned with a sub marginal line of gray dots, sometimes very discoloured on the forewings. In the female it is brown with a short submarginal line of orange spots very discoloured on the forewings. 
The underside of the male is white-coloured or very light grey-blue adorned with a submarginal line of light spots while the female is ochre adorned with brown dots and a submarginal line of brown dots surrounded by orange colour that surrounding brown dots. The butterfly flies from June to August in a single generation. Its habitat consists of dry places with flowers, between rocks, 900 m to 1800 meters.
The larvae feed on Hippocrepis comosa and Hippocrepis multisiliquosa. They are attended by ants.

References

External links
Butterflies of Europe

Butterflies of Europe
Butterflies of Africa
Lysandra (butterfly)
Butterflies described in 1851